Seyed Mohsen Nourbakhsh (18 May 1948 – 23 March 2003) was an Iranian economist, most known as governor of the Central Bank of Iran and the former minister of finance of Iran. Nourbakhsh had pro-market views.

Personal life and education
Born in Isfahan, Nourbakhsh received a bachelor's degree from the University of Tehran in economics, and a Master of Arts and PhD from the University of California at Davis in econometrics.

Career
Shortly after the Iranian Revolution, Nourbakhsh's nomination for finance minister was rejected by the president Abolhassan Banisadr. Nourbakhsh was then named deputy finance minister and held that office until 1981.

In 1988, Nourbakhsh became a member of the Majlis and a representative for Tehran. Next he was nominated for the economy and finance minister to the government of the then-president Akbar Hashemi Rafsanjani in 1989. He was approved by the Majlis with 195 for and 43 against votes. In the Summer of 1993, he was forced by the Majlis to resign.

Nourbakhsh was then appointed the governor of the Central Bank of Iran by president Akbar Hashemi Rafsanjani in 1994 and he was in office until his death in 2003. In 1999 president Mohammad Khatami reappoints him as the governor. During the first term of president Mohammad Khatami, Hossein Namazi was the minister of economy and finance. There was rivalry between Nourbakhsh and Namazi in regard to the economic policy.

Death
Nourbakhsh died of a heart attack on 23 March 2003. He had had a heart failure since his childhood, and had undergone a heart surgery. Mohammad Khatami, in a condolence message, praised Nourbakhsh as a "very sincere, intelligent and capable serviceman" and described his death as a "great loss."

Mohammad Javad Vahaji, deputy governor, replaced Nourbakhsh and later in the year, Ebrahim Sheibani was his successor as governor.

References

1948 births
2003 deaths
University of Tehran alumni
University of California, Davis alumni
Politicians from Isfahan
Iranian economists
Finance ministers of Iran
Executives of Construction Party politicians
Vice presidents of Iran for Economic Affairs
Governors of the Central Bank of Iran